Auguste Schepp (1846–1905) was a German painter.

Biography
Schepp was born on 3 April 1846 in Wiesbaden. She studied with studied with Eugen Napoleon Neureuther in Munich, and Karl Ferdinand Sohn in Düsseldorf. In 1892 Schepp settled in Munich and became part of the Munich Secession.  She exhibited her work at the Woman's Building at the 1893 World's Columbian Exposition in Chicago, Illinois.

Schepp died on 12 April 1905 in Freiburg im Breisgau.

References

External links
  
 images of Schepp's work on ArtNet

1846 births
1905 deaths
German women painters
19th-century German women artists
19th-century German painters
People from Wiesbaden